Mycobacterium avium is a species of the phylum Actinomycetota (Gram-positive bacteria with high guanine and cytosine content, one of the dominant phyla of all bacteria), belonging to the genus Mycobacterium.

The type strain is ATCC 25291 = CCUG 20992 = CIP 104244 = DSM 44156 = NCTC 13034.

The subspecies name Mycobacterium avium subsp. avium Chester 1901 is automatically created by the valid publication of Mycobacterium avium subsp. paratuberculosis (Bergey et al. 1923) and the valid publication of Mycobacterium avium subsp. silvaticum Thorel et al. 1990.

Based on differences in IS1245 RFLP, 16S-23S rDNA ITS and growth temperature, Mijs et al. 2002 propose to reserve the designation Mycobacterium avium subsp. avium for bird-type isolates. These authors suggest, but do not formally propose, the designation "Mycobacterium avium subsp. hominissuis" for the isolates from humans and pigs.

Epidemiology
Present mainly in cattle and humans with an immunocompromised disorder, e.g. AIDS, it is transmitted to man by drinking unpasteurized cow milk.  Pigs are susceptible to M. avium avium , M. bovis, and M. tuberculosis, with M. avium being most common. Lesions are typically lymphoid, gastrointestinal, or rapidly progressive disseminated forms. Intradermal testing is the diagnostic test of choice. Isolation of purified protein derivatives is useful for M. bovis and M. tuberculosis. However, cross-reaction between M. avium avium, M. tuberculosis, or M. avium paratuberculosis is a disadvantage.

Dogs, cats, deer, mink, cattle, birds (serotypes 1, 2, and 3) and some cold-blooded animals are all also susceptible to M. avium.

False-negative tuberculin tests are common in dogs. Radiographs and a thorough history are useful in diagnosis. Affected dogs should be euthanized because of public health concerns.

References

J.P. Euzéby: List of Prokaryotic Names with Standing in Nomenclature - genus Mycobacterium

External links
Type strain of Mycobacterium avium avium at BacDive -  the Bacterial Diversity Metadatabase

Acid-fast bacilli
avium avium
Bacteria described in 1901